Capricorn is the second studio album released by American musician Trevor Powers under his own name, after previously releasing three studio albums under the name Youth Lagoon. It was released on July 29, 2020 via Bandcamp, including a limited edition run of cassette tapes and book, before being released digitally everywhere on July 31, 2020 via Fat Possum Records.

All songs were written and produced by Trevor Powers, mixing by Jason Kingsland, with art direction and design handled by Los Angeles-based designer Collin Fletcher. The album art sigil was designed by graphic designer Baptiste Bernazeau.

Background 
On July 29, 2020, Powers surprise-released his second album under his own name, titled Capricorn. It was recorded in a cabin near the Sawtooth Mountains in Idaho. “From the minute we wake up, we’re in a trance,” Powers said of the album. “This is music for our digital coma.”

Powers also released a short film to accompany the album, also titled Capricorn, on September 23, 2020. Co-directed by the album designer, Collin Fletcher, and Jamie Parkhurst, the film is set in a world "plagued by pollution and developmental decay" and is meant to depict a new generation that has grown up acclimated to a bleak environment, accompanied by the 29 minutes of Capricorn.

Track listing

References 

2020 albums
Trevor Powers albums
Fat Possum Records albums